is a former Japanese football player.

Playing career
Ito was born in Saitama Prefecture on May 7, 1983. After graduating from high school, he joined the J2 League club Cerezo Osaka in 2002. Cerezo won second place during the 2002 season and was promoted to the J1 League. In 2004, he moved to the J2 club Mito HollyHock. He became a regular player as a left side back soon afterward. However he lost his position in May and played as a substitute in May. Although he played often in 2005, he retired at the end of the 2005 season.

Club statistics

References

External links

1983 births
Living people
Association football people from Saitama Prefecture
Japanese footballers
J1 League players
J2 League players
Cerezo Osaka players
Mito HollyHock players
Association football midfielders